German submarine U-438 was a Type VIIC U-boat of Nazi Germany's Kriegsmarine during World War II.

The submarine was laid down on 25 April 1940 at the Schichau-Werke yard as yard number 1480 in Danzig, launched on 6 September 1941 and commissioned on 22 November 1941 under the command of Kapitänleutnant Rudolf Franzius.

The city of Berlin adopted the submarine within the popular sponsorship programme (Patenschaftsprogramm), organising gifts and holidays for the crew and earning her the honorary name of U-438 Berlin. The U-boat served with the 8th U-Boat Flotilla for her training and later with the 9th Flotilla from 1 August 1942 to her loss on 6 May 1943. U-438 completed four patrols, sinking three ships, totalling  and damaging one ship totalling .

She was a member of ten wolfpacks.

Design
German Type VIIC submarines were preceded by the shorter Type VIIB submarines. U-438 had a displacement of  when at the surface and  while submerged. She had two shafts and two  propellers.

U-438 was fitted with five  torpedo tubes (four fitted at the bow and one at the stern), fourteen torpedoes, one  SK C/35 naval gun, 220 rounds, and a  C/30 anti-aircraft gun. The boat had a complement of between forty-four and sixty.

Service history

First patrol
U-438 sailed from Kiel in Germany, on 1 August 1942 and headed for the mid-Atlantic. On 10 August she took part in a "wolfpack" attack on Convoy SC 94, south of Iceland. Both ships, badly damaged, fell behind the main convoy and were sunk by U-438 several hours later.

On 11 August U-438 joined Wolfpack 'Lohs', which operated in the north Atlantic. On 25 August U-438 attacked convoy ON 122, which she had been stalking since the 22nd, sinking the Norwegian 1,598 GRT merchant ship Trolla. Several hours later U-438 was detected on radar by the Norwegian  , and within a few minutes the ship spotted the surfaced U-boat in fog and opened fire with her 4-inch gun, before attacking with depth charges as U-438 crash-dived. The corvette continued to attack, forcing the U-boat to the surface after the bow compartment was flooded. Unable to dive, U-438 escaped in the fog. After making repairs she was ordered to return to base, arriving at Brest in occupied France, on 3 September.

Second patrol
U-438 sailed from Brest on 6 October 1942. U-438 returned to Brest on 19 November.

Third patrol
U-438 left Brest again on 31 December 1942 for another mid-Atlantic patrol, but had no successes before returning to base on 16 February.

Fourth patrol and loss
She sailed from Brest on 31 March 1943 and was unsuccessfully attacked by a Catalina flying boat of 5 squadron, RAF on 4 May 1943. On 6 May the U-boat was sunk with all hands, north-west Newfoundland at position
, by depth charges from the Egret class sloop .

Wolfpacks
U-438 took part in ten wolfpacks, namely:
 Lohs (11 – 25 August 1942) 
 Tümmler (6 – 9 October 1942) 
 Panther (13 – 20 October 1942)
 Veilchen (20 October – 5 November 1942)
 Habicht (11 – 19 January 1943)
 Haudegen (19 January – 8 February 1943)
 Adler (11 – 13 April 1943)
 Meise (13 – 22 April 1943)
 Specht (22 April – 4 May 1943)
 Fink (4 – 6 May 1943)

Summary of raiding history

References

Bibliography

External links

German Type VIIC submarines
U-boats commissioned in 1941
U-boats sunk in 1943
U-boats sunk by depth charges
U-boats sunk by British warships
World War II submarines of Germany
World War II shipwrecks in the Atlantic Ocean
Shipwrecks of the Newfoundland and Labrador coast
1941 ships
Ships built in Danzig
Ships built by Schichau
Ships lost with all hands
Maritime incidents in May 1943